Borkowice  is a village in the administrative district of Gmina Kluczbork, within Kluczbork County, Opole Voivodeship, in south-western Poland.

The village has a population of 943.

References

Borkowice